Brigadier-General Sir William Alexander  (4 May 1874 – 29 December 1954) was a British Army officer, civil servant, and Scottish Unionist Party politician.  He was the Member of Parliament (MP) for Glasgow Central between the general elections of 1923 to 1945, when he stood down.

References

External links

1874 births
1954 deaths
Unionist Party (Scotland) MPs
UK MPs 1923–1924
UK MPs 1924–1929
UK MPs 1929–1931
UK MPs 1931–1935
UK MPs 1935–1945
Members of the Parliament of the United Kingdom for Glasgow constituencies
Companions of the Distinguished Service Order
British Army generals of World War I
Royal Air Force generals of World War I
Scottish generals
Knights Commander of the Order of the British Empire
Companions of the Order of the Bath
Companions of the Order of St Michael and St George
Black Watch officers
Civil servants in the Ministry of Munitions